Anna Heidenhain (born 1979 Wiesbaden) is a German artist.

She studied at the Kunstakademie Düsseldorf.
Since 2006, she worked with Hugo Holger Schneider and Elmar Hermann on the "nüans" project space. Her work has shifted from sculpture towards social space. In 2006, she received an artist's grant to work at the Goyang National Art Studio, in Korea.

She has been living and working in Istanbul since 2007. 
She organized with Kristina Kramer Manzara Perspectives until 11/2009 in Galata, Istanbul.

Awards
2010 Villa Romana prize

References

External links
Artist's website
 nüans' website

German artists
1979 births
People from Wiesbaden
Living people
Kunstakademie Düsseldorf alumni